Erigeron pauper is a species of flowering plant in the family Asteraceae. It is endemic to Ecuador, where it is known from a single collection made in 1931 on the Pichincha Volcano. Because the volcano is adjacent to Quito, urban growth is considered to be a threat to its habitat.

References

External links

pauper
Endemic flora of Ecuador
Endangered plants
Taxonomy articles created by Polbot